Richard Brewer or Dick Brewer may refer to:
 Richard Brewer (soldier) (17th century), English army officer
 Richard M. Brewer (1850–1878), American cowboy and outlaw
 Richard B. Brewer (1951–2012), American businessman and executive
 Richard L. Brewer Jr. (1864–1947), Virginia politician
 Rick Brewer, New Brunswick businessman and politician
 Rick Brewer (academic) (born 1956), president of Louisiana College in Pineville, Louisiana